Oknha Choeung Sopheap, also known as Yeay Phu, is a Sino-Cambodian businesswoman. She owns Pheapimex, a major conglomerate with her husband Lau Meng Khin. She was awarded the title of Oknha in 2006. Her businesses have been linked to industrial-scale illegal logging and eviction.

Personal life 
Sopheap is a Chinese Cambodian. She is married to Lau Meng Khin. They both hold Cypriot citizenship. She has several biological children, including Choeung Thean Seng and  Cheong Sukuntheavy, who is married to Sopheap's step-son, Lau Vann. 

Sopheap's family has courted significant scrutiny for their significant wealth, including properties in Australia. The family also has significant business and marriage ties to the children of Hun Sen.

References 

Cambodian businesspeople
Living people
People from Phnom Penh
Cambodian people of Chinese descent
Cypriot people of Cambodian descent